Staying Alive is an MTV international initiative to encourage HIV prevention, promote safer lifestyle choices and fight the stigma and discrimination that fuels the HIV epidemic. Staying Alive is now the world’s largest HIV mass media awareness and prevention campaign. It produces TV programming in the form of concerts, documentaries, public service announcements, TV film, film competitions, and others. It also boasts a 13-language website with celebrity content talking about safe sex.

Goals and objective

Goals

Staying Alive’s aim is to reduce HIV infections among young people globally. It does this by using entertainment to bring across vital safe sex information so that young people are empowered to make safer sexual and lifestyle decisions.

Objectives 

• To raise awareness and knowledge about HIV/AIDS and safer sex skills for young people.

• To fight the stigma and discrimination associated with HIV/AIDS.

• To empower young people to take concrete action to protect themselves and others against HIV/AIDS.

• To engage other businesses, media and organizations to form their own response to HIV/AIDS. This includes broadcasting or using Staying Alive material rights free, at no cost.

Reach 

Staying Alive currently reaches 64% of the world’s TV households, and 90% of the top 50 AIDS affected countries. Staying Alive’s distribution reach extends to all but thirteen countries in the world.  Staying Alive does this, not only through MTV’s extensive global reach, but also with its rights free strategy, enabling all broadcasters around the world to air Staying Alive content at no cost.

History 

Staying Alive began in 1998 as a one off award-winning documentary, of the same name, about six young people from around the world and how their lives were affected by HIV and AIDS and was hosted by George Michael.
In 2002, Staying Alive expanded into an ongoing global multi media campaign that provides targeted information about HIV and AIDS using a wide range of interventions that include programming, advocacy and grant-making. Staying Alive is now the world’s leading media response to HIV and AIDS, developing widely recognized cutting edge products as part of its comprehensive approach. 
In 2005, Staying Alive launched the Staying Alive Foundation to provide small grants to young people who are responding to the multiple threats of HIV, through prevention and create enabling environments for HIV+ people in their communities.

Evaluation 

The 2005 evaluation of Staying Alive found that the campaign resulted in significantly more interpersonal communication about HIV/AIDS amongst those who were exposed to the campaign and that this in turn had a positive effect on social norms. More young people exposed to the campaign felt it was important to use a condom, discussed HIV with a sexual partner and reported getting tested for HIV.

The Staying Alive Foundation 

In 2005 the Staying Alive Foundation was launched.  The Staying Alive Foundation is a public charity registered in the US and UK and supported by MTV. Twice yearly, the Foundation presents the Staying Alive Awards: small grants that support innovative projects by youth-led organizations in schools, youth centers, and clubs using radio, TV, print, on-line and personal interactions that reach at-risk youth and protect them from the multiple threats posed by HIV and AIDS. 
The Foundation's mandate to support individuals fighting AIDS on the frontlines is an unusual grant-making strategy that is showing extraordinary results as more and more young Award winners become HIV-prevention leaders in their communities. 
In 2008 the R&B singer-songwriter Kelly Rowland was appointed as the global Ambassador for the MTV Staying Alive Foundation. In June 2008, Kelly Rowland visited SAF projects in Kenya, Tanzania and South Africa.

See also
 The Mpowerment Project
 Advocates for Youth

References

HIV/AIDS prevention organizations
HIV/AIDS activism
MTV
Health campaigns
Medical and health organisations based in the United Kingdom